Faery: Legends of Avalon is a role-playing video game released for Xbox Live Arcade on 10 November 2010, and for PlayStation Network and Microsoft Windows in 2011. It was developed by Spiders Studio and published by Focus Home Interactive.

Plot 
In the game, the player assumes control over a winged faery who has just emerged from stasis. The faery king Oberon informs the player that because humans have stopped believing in faeries, the power of magic has failed and the faery civilization and its inhabitants are slowly being destroyed. The player's objective is to assemble a party of magical creatures and attempt to save several mythical worlds from destruction. The mythical worlds that serve as the game's setting are drawn from preexisting mythologies, and include the ghost ship Flying Dutchman, the great tree Yggdrasil, and the City of Mirage, which is built on the back of a giant beetle.

Gameplay 
There are two components to the gameplay of Faery: Legends of Avalon, combat and (non-combat) exploration. The game uses a turn based combat system in combat. The attacks available to characters are in part determined by the player's choices when leveling up the characters. Outside of combat, the player character can fly, and therefore exploration takes place in three dimensions, as opposed to the more common two dimensional exploration seen in most other role playing games. The game features a small number of options for customizing the player character, including the gender and face of the character, the equipment that the character uses, and what new abilities are gained when the character levels up. All of these options change the in-game appearance of the player character.

Reception 

 
The game received "mixed" reviews on all platforms according to the review aggregation website Metacritic. Critics praised the game's vivid visuals, which employ cel-shading, the bright and upbeat music, and the creative depictions of several well known mythical worlds. However, they also point out that the quests are tedious and repetitive, that the dialogue is bare bones and contains numerous spelling errors, and that the combat is excessively easy. Kevin VanOrd of GameSpot summarized the Xbox 360 version as "disappointingly threadbare" and stated that "Legends of Avalon amounts to a bunch of bland missions separated by elementary turn-based battles that inspire only a few faint yawns."

Since its release, the Xbox 360 version sold 48,248 units worldwide by the end of 2011.

References

External links 
 

2010 video games
Fairies and sprites in popular culture
Fantasy video games
Focus Entertainment games
PlayStation 3 games
PlayStation Network games
Role-playing video games
Spiders (company) games
Video games developed in France
Video games featuring protagonists of selectable gender
Windows games
Xbox 360 Live Arcade games